Nezaz (also Romanized as Nezāz and Nazāz; also known as Najāj, Nazāzo, and Nezār) is a village in Gavrud Rural District, Muchesh District, Kamyaran County, Kurdistan Province, Iran. At the 2006 census, its population was 484, in 113 families. The village is populated by Kurds.

References 

Towns and villages in Kamyaran County
Kurdish settlements in Kurdistan Province